Henry Willy Engler Golovchenko (born 1946 in Paysandú) is a Uruguayan neuroscientist.

Student at the University of the Republic, he obtained his BA-level degree in 1970.

During the late 1960s and early 1970s he was a prominent member of the Tupamaros. For that reason he spent 13 years in jail during the civic-military dictatorship of Uruguay.

Later he emigrated to Sweden, where he obtained his PhD at the University of Uppsala. In 2002 he injected for the first time in healthy volunteers and Alzheimer's patients the substance PIB (Pittsburgh compound B) to detect amyloid plaques in the brain. The results were presented at the World Alzheimer's Conference in Stockholm.

References

1946 births
People from Paysandú
Uruguayan people of Ukrainian descent
Uruguayan people of German descent
University of the Republic (Uruguay) alumni
Uppsala University alumni
Uruguayan neuroscientists
Uruguayan expatriates in Sweden
Living people